Mělník District is a district in the Central Bohemian Region of the Czech Republic. Its capital is the town of Mělník.

Administrative division
Mělník District is divided into three administrative districts of municipalities with extended competence: Mělník, Kralupy nad Vltavou and Neratovice.

List of municipalities
Towns are marked in bold and market towns in italics:

Býkev -
Byšice -
Čakovičky -
Čečelice -
Chlumín -
Chorušice -
Chvatěruby -
Cítov -
Dobřeň -
Dolany nad Vltavou - 
Dolní Beřkovice -
Dolní Zimoř -
Dřínov -
Hořín -
Horní Počaply -
Hostín -
Hostín u Vojkovic -
Jeviněves -
Kadlín -
Kanina -
Kly -
Kojetice -
Kokořín -
Kostelec nad Labem -
Kozomín -
Kralupy nad Vltavou -
Ledčice -
Lhotka -
Liběchov -
Libiš -
Liblice -
Lobeč -
Lužec nad Vltavou -
Malý Újezd -
Medonosy -
Mělnické Vtelno -
Mělník -
Mšeno -
Nebužely -
Nedomice -
Nelahozeves -
Neratovice -
Nosálov -
Nová Ves -
Obříství -
Olovnice -
Ovčáry -
Postřižín -
Řepín -
Spomyšl -
Stránka -
Střemy -
Tišice -
Tuhaň -
Tupadly -
Újezdec -
Úžice -
Velký Borek -
Veltrusy -
Vidim -
Vojkovice -
Vraňany -
Všestudy -
Všetaty -
Vysoká -
Zálezlice -
Želízy -
Zlončice -
Zlosyň

Geography

The landscape is mostly flat and belongs to the Polabí lowlands, only the northern part of the district is hilly and forested areas prevail. The territory extends into four geomorphological mesoregions: Jizera Table (east), Ralsko Uplands (north), Lower Eger Table (west) and Central Elbe Table (south). It is also the lowest point of the entire Central Bohemian Region.

The confluence of the two longest rivers in the country, Elbe and Vltava, is located in the centre of the district. The Elbe then flows further to the north. There are not many bodies of water.

Kokořínsko – Máchův kraj is the only protected landscape area that extends into the district, into its northern part.

Demographics

Most populated municipalities

Economy
The largest employers with its headquarters in Mělník District and at least 500 employers are:

Transport
The D8 motorway from Prague to Ústí nad Labem passes through the western part of the district.

Sights

The most important monuments in the district, protected as national cultural monuments, are:
Kokořín Castle
Veltrusy Mansion

The best-preserved settlements, protected as monument reservations and monument zones, are:

Dobřeň (monument reservation)
Nosálov (monument reservation)
Nové Osinalice (monument reservation)
Olešno (monument reservation)
Kostelec nad Labem
Mělník
Mšeno
Debrno
Jestřebice
Lobeč
Sitné
Střezivojice
Vidim
Vrbno

The most visited tourist destination is the Kokořín Castle.

References

External links

Mělník District profile on the Czech Statistical Office's website

 
Districts of the Czech Republic